Ramularius pygmaeus is a species of beetle in the family Cerambycidae. It was described by Per Olof Christopher Aurivillius in 1908.

The species has been found in Zimbabwe, Mozambique, and South Africa.

References

Apomecynini
Beetles described in 1908